Henda is a feminine given name. It has several unrelated origins. As a name of Yiddish origin it means "gracious" or "merciful" in Hebrew. It can also be a shortened form of the Dutch name Hendrika, cognate to the Germanic name Henry. Notable people named Henda include:
 Henda Ayari (born 1976), French writer, feminist and secular activist
 Henda Ducados (born 1964), French-Angolan economist and sociologist
 Henda Swart (born 1939), South African mathematician
 Henda Zaouali (born 1960), retired Tunisian fencer

Yiddish feminine given names
Hebrew feminine given names